The 2007 European Cup was held in San Marino on June 12 to June 16. Kinheim Haarlem were the winners of the competition.

Results

Group A

Group B

Finals
Semifinals:
Kinheim Haarlem (Netherlands) defeated San Marino (Italy) 7–0
Huskies de Rouen (France) defeated Rimini (Italy) 4–3

3rd Place:
Rimini (Italy) defeated San Marino (Italy) 1–9

Final:
Kinheim Haarlem (Netherlands) defeated Huskies de Rouen (France) 3–1

References
European Cup results at Sports123.com

European Cup
European Cup (baseball)